Jiayi may refer to:

Chinese people
 Jia Yi (201–169 BCE), a Chinese poet

as Chiayi
 Chiayi City, provincial city in southern Taiwan, completely surrounded by Chiayi County
 Chiayi County, county in southern Taiwan, completely surrounds but does not include Chiayi City